PP-153 Lahore-X is a Constituency of Provincial Assembly of Punjab.

General elections 2013 
These elections were won by Ghulam Habib Awan in 2013 for thesixteenth Assembly.

General elections 2008
These elections were won by Ghulam Habib Awan in 2008 for the Fifteenth Assembly.

See also
 PP-152 Lahore-IX
 PP-154 Lahore-XI

References

External links
 Election commission Pakistan's official website
 Awazoday.com check result
 Official Website of Government of Punjab

Constituencies of Punjab, Pakistan